Hump Creek is a stream in the U.S. state of South Dakota.

Hump Creek has the name of Chief Hump, a Sioux Indian who settled there.

See also
List of rivers of South Dakota

References

Rivers of Haakon County, South Dakota
Rivers of South Dakota